Sebitseom (세빛섬), also known as Sebit islets, are artificial islands in the Han River, Seoul, South Korea. It was built at the suggestion of Kim Eun-sung (citizen of Seoul City) in 2006. Seoul City made this island by Build-Transfer-Operate (BTO). It has 3 islands: Gavit, Chavit, and Solvit. Yevit is part of Sebitseom, but is not an island itself, but rather, it's an on-land multimedia art gallery complementing the three floating islands.

Background
Sebitseom, covering a combined area of 10,421 m2 (Gavit: 4,881 m2, Chavit: 3,477 m2, Solvit: 1,271 m2, Yevit: 792 m2), was set to open as a private equity consortium in September 2011 containing convention halls and performance and display areas, along with commercial areas (e.g. restaurant, cafés, etc.), but due to managerial conflicts, the plan was indefinitely postponed. In September 2009, however, roughly $86 million (USD) were invested into Sebitseom (then-named Flo Some or 플로섬) to build the lobbies, decks, and rooftops of each island. As of May 2011, 47% of Some Sevit is owned by Hyosung Group; 10% is owned by Jinheung Company, an affiliate of Hyosung Group; and 29% is owned by SH Construction. Some Sevit has been managed and operated by a manufacturing firm named CR101. Monthly expenses on upkeep and rentals reach around $970,000 (USD) or an annual expense of roughly $11.6 million. The projected expenses is estimated to be over $268 million (unadjusted for inflation) during the next 25 years.

History
 2006 November: Suggestion to create artificial islands on Han River received
 2009 November: Yevit completed construction (the media art gallery)
 2011 April: Sebitseom completed construction and placed into Han River
 2011 May 21: Outside viewing areas opened
 2014 May: Opening of Gavit
 2014 July: Opening of Chavit
 2014 November: Inaugural opening of Some Sevit to the public

Controversy
The luxury brand Fendi held a fashion show on June 3, 2011, unveiling its Fall and Winter collection, amidst heavy protests from animal rights activists. When it was reported that the show would focus on fur items, the Seoul government demanded fur to be excluded from the show "in response to protests from anti-fur activists about this use of a public venue." In response to government demands, Fendi cited the lack of time left until the show (there were only weeks left before the show) and the time and money they had already spent in preparation. In response to the protest, however, Fendi decided to diminish the show's focus on fur by introducing a greater variety of items, such as shoes, bags, and other accessories. Earlier in the year, a popular SBS TV program, "TV Animal Farm," aired an episode bringing awareness to the fur industry and to the living conditions of animals farmed for fur. It depicted actual footage of the process of collecting fur from live animals and shocked viewers, which may have impacted the number of protesters against the fashion show.

Characteristic of each island
 Gavit (가빛섬, Island 1, Vista): It is an island of performing arts. It contains a performance hall and moonlight trail. 
 Chavit (채빛섬, Island 2, Viva): It is the first island among these 3 islands. It has culture experience facilities. It is an island of entertainment.
 Solvit (솔빛섬, Island 3, Terra): It is an island of water leisure. There is water leisure facilities.
 Yevit (예빛섬, Media Art Gallery): It is also a floating structure along with the three floating islands.

In popular culture
Sebitseom has been featured in Korean dramas including She Was Pretty Athena: Goddess of War. The islets were featured in the blockbuster movie Avengers: Age of Ultron as the site of laboratories of Dr. Helen Cho. The final runway show from cycle 21 of America's Next Top Model was set near the islets. The islets were also used as the site of a pit stop during the eleventh episode of The Amazing Race 29.

References

External links

Artificial islands of South Korea
Floating islands
Seocho District
Islands of the Han River (Korea)
Islands of Seoul